The surname Olivier may refer to:

 The Olivier brothers René, Aimé, and Marius, French pioneering bicycle manufacturers
 Aimé Olivier de Sanderval (1840–1919), French explorer, entrepreneur and writer
 André Olivier (born 1989), South African middle distance runner
 Brenden Olivier (born 1992), South African rugby union player
 Charles Olivier, American screenwriter
 Charles Pollard Olivier (1884–1975), American astronomer
 Chris Olivier (born 1984), American professional basketball player
 David Olivier (born 1956), French and British philosopher and antispeciesist activist
 Edith Olivier (1872–1948), English writer, mayor and hostess
 Ernest Olivier (1844–1914), French entomologist and botanist
 Fernande Olivier (1881–1966), French model
 George Olivier, count of Wallis (1671–1743), Austrian field marshal
 George Borg Olivier (1911–1980), Prime Minister of Malta from 1950 to 1955 and from 1962 to 1971
 Géraldine Olivier (born 1967), Swiss singer 
 Gerhard Olivier (born 1993), South African rugby union player
 Guillaume-Antoine Olivier (1756–1814), French entomologist
 Herbert Arnould Olivier (1861–1952), English painter
 Jacques Olivier (born 1944), Canadian politician
 Jan Hendrik Olivier (1848-1930), Boer war general
 Jean-Baptiste Olivier (1765–1813), French general
 Juste Olivier (1807–1876), Swiss poet
 Laurence Olivier (1907–1989), English actor
 Louis Auguste Olivier (1816–1881), Canadian lawyer, judge and politician
 Louis-Éphrem Olivier (1848–1882), Canadian physician and politician
 Mathieu Olivier (born 1997), American ice hockey player
 Maud Olivier (born 1953), French politician
 Noël Olivier, daughter of Sydney Haldane Olivier, friend of Rupert Brooke
 Sidney Olivier (1870–1932), English cricketer
 Sydney Olivier, 1st Baron Olivier (1859–1943), British civil servant,
 Théodore Olivier (1793–1853), French mathematician
 Veronica Olivier (born 1990), Italian actress 
 Wynand Olivier (born 1983), South African rugby union player

See also
 Olivieri
 Oliver (surname)

Surnames
Surnames of British Isles origin
Surnames of French origin
French-language surnames